Chomsurang Upatham School is a boarding school for girls in Ayutthaya province, Thailand established in 1919.

References

Boarding schools in Thailand
Girls' schools in Thailand
Educational institutions established in 1919
Phra Nakhon Si Ayutthaya province
Schools in Thailand